M Khademul Bashar, Bir Uttom  (1 September 1935 – 1 September 1976) was Chief of Air Staff of the Bangladesh Air Force during 1976.  He also held the office of Deputy Chief Martial Law Administrator and was in charge of the Ministry of Petroleum, the Ministry of Food and Civil Aviation and the Department of Tourism.

Early life 
Bashar was born in Natore on 1 September 1935 and educated at Satkhira Prananath High School and Rajshahi College.

Career 
As Wing Commander he served as Senior Operations Officer of Tejgaon Air Base, including with responsibility of overall security of Dhaka International Airport until 27 March 1971. Group Captain A. K. Khandker, Bashar, and several other pilots defected in May 1971 and escaped to India. He was among the only two BAF officers appointed as BDF Sector Commander during Bangladesh War of Independence with Pakistan by C-in-C Colonel M.A.G Osmani who appointed him BDF Commander Sector 6. The other officer being Squadron Leader M. Hamidullah Khan, who was serving as Asst. Provost Marshal and second in command of security and investigations at PAF Tejgaon Air Base and Dacca International Airport until March 1971. Later on November 3 C-in-C Col. M.A.G Osmani appointed M. Hamidullah Khan as BDF Commander Sector 11.

Death
Bashar died on 1 September 1976 in an air crash. He was attending the inauguration of the Flying Instructors School at Tejgaon in Dhaka. On its maiden flight, an NZAI Air Tourer rolled over and crashed nose down into the airfield. Both the pilot Sqn Ldr Haq and Bashar were killed instantly.  BAF Base at Tejgaon, Dhaka has been renamed Base Bashar in his honour.

References

|-

1935 births
1976 deaths
Bangladesh Air Force air marshals
People from Bogra District
Rajshahi College alumni
Chiefs of Air Staff (Bangladesh)
Mukti Bahini personnel